Grobia  is a village in the administrative district of Gmina Sieraków, within Międzychód County, Greater Poland Voivodeship, in west-central Poland.

The village has a population of 334 (31.10.2010).

References

Grobia